Loring (Lingít: Kax̱.àan) was established in 1885 with the first post office in the District of Alaska and is a census-designated place (CDP) in Ketchikan Gateway Borough in the U.S. state of Alaska. The population was 4 at the 2010 census, although the number increases in summer months.

Located due north of downtown Ketchikan on Revillagigedo Island, Loring was once Ketchikan's rival as the service center for the area's fishing and timber industries.

Geography

It is located on the northern shore of Naha Bay, an arm of Behm Canal.

Demographics

Loring first appeared on the 1890 U.S. Census as an unincorporated fishing village and cannery. It consisted of 200 residents, of which a majority (120) were native (presumably Tlingit), 51 were Asian (Chinese), 27 were white, and 2 were Creole (mixed native and Russian). This population figure also included adjacent native fishing camps. It returned in 1900 with 168 residents, but the census did not provide a racial breakdown. Although the cannery and post office at Loring continued to operate until 1930 and 1936, respectively, it did not report on the census again from after 1900 until 110 years later, in 2010. It was made a census-designated place (CDP), with just 4 residents (2 of 2 or more races, 1 Native American & 1 White resident).

References

1885 establishments in Alaska
Populated places established in 1885
Census-designated places in Alaska
Census-designated places in Ketchikan Gateway Borough, Alaska
Ghost towns in Alaska
Populated coastal places in Alaska on the Pacific Ocean
Road-inaccessible communities of Alaska